Ganoderiols are bio-active sterols isolated from Ganoderma lucidum.

References

Sterols